Adrian Alvarado (born August 2, 1983) is a Mexican figure skater. He is the 2005 Mexican national bronze medalist and is a four-time competitor at the Four Continents Championships. Alvarado is coached by Olga Markova and trains for part of the year in Moscow. Il travaille maintenant comme entraîneur à la patinoire de Louviers (Glacéo) où il entraîne les patineurs artistiques ainsi que  l'équipe de synchro.

Competitive highlights

 J = Junior level

External links
 
 Official Site of Adrian Alvarado

Mexican male single skaters
Sportspeople from Mexico City
1983 births
Living people
Competitors at the 2011 Winter Universiade
Competitors at the 2005 Winter Universiade
Competitors at the 2009 Winter Universiade
21st-century Mexican people